The XXVII Reserve Corps was a corps-level command of the German army during World War I.

Formation 
XXVII Reserve Corps was formed in October 1914.  It was part of the first wave of new Corps formed at the outset of World War I consisting of XXII - XXVII Reserve Corps of 43rd - 54th Reserve Divisions (plus 6th Bavarian Reserve Division).  The personnel was predominantly made up of kriegsfreiwillige (wartime volunteers) who did not wait to be called up.  It was still in existence at the end of the war.

Structure on formation 
On formation in October 1914, XXVII Reserve Corps consisted of two divisions. but was weaker than an Active Corps
Reserve Infantry Regiments consisted of three battalions but only had a machine gun platoon (of 2 machine guns) rather than a machine gun company (of 6 machine guns)
Reserve Jäger Battalions did not have a machine gun company on formation, though some were provided with a machine gun platoon
Reserve Cavalry Detachments were much smaller than the Reserve Cavalry Regiments formed on mobilisation
Reserve Field Artillery Regiments consisted of three abteilungen (2 gun and 1 howitzer) of three batteries each, but each battery had just 4 guns (rather than 6 of the Active and the Reserve Regiments formed on mobilisation)

In summary, XXVII Reserve Corps mobilised with 26 infantry battalions, 10 machine gun platoons (20 machine guns), 2 cavalry detachments, 18 field artillery batteries (72 guns) and 2 pioneer companies.

Combat chronicle 
Formed of Saxon and Württemberg units in the early stages of the First World War, the Corps appeared on the Western Front in Belgium in October 1914.  It was assigned to the 4th Army, commanded by Generalfeldmarschall Albrecht, Duke of Württemberg,  with which it participated in the First Battle of Ypres.  In 1915, it took part in the Second Battle of Ypres and the Second Battle of Champagne and in 1916 in the Battle of the Somme.

In November 1916, it was transferred to the Eastern Front.  In late 1917 it returned to the West, initially on border security duties on the Dutch-Belgian border, before returning to the Flanders front in January 1918.  It took part in the German spring offensive from March 1918 and continued to be engaged on the Western Front for the remainder of the War.

The Corps was dissolved in February 1919.

Commanders 
XXVII Reserve Corps had the following commanders during its existence:

See also

References

Bibliography 
 
 
 
 
 

Corps of Germany in World War I
Military units and formations established in 1914
Military units and formations disestablished in 1919